

Videography
1988: Red Hot Skate Rock - live
1989: Hard 'n Heavy Vol. 2 - "Good Time Boys" music video and interviews
1990: Psychedelic Sexfunk Live from Heaven - live
1991: Positive Mental Octopus - music videos
1991: Best Of The Cutting Edge Volume II - music videos
1992: Funky Monks - making of Blood Sugar Sex Magik album
1992: What Hits!? - music videos
1994: Live On Air
2001: Off the Map - live
2001: Rock Your Socks Off (Unauthorized) - documentary 
2002: Rockthology 1: Hard N Heavy - music videos/interviews
2003: Greatest Hits and Videos - music videos/behind the scenes
2003: Live at Slane Castle - live
2004: Rock Odyssey 2004 - live
2004: The Last Gang In Town - documentary 
2006: The Red Hot Chili Peppers Phenomenon - documentary
2006: iTunes Originals - Red Hot Chili Peppers - Combination of live performances, interviews and music videos available exclusively on iTunes
2007: Red Hot Chili Peppers In Performance - Live/Documentary

Music videos

Notes
 The video for "Catholic School Girls Rule" was aired only once in the U.S., on the Playboy Channel, because of a nude scene. 
 A video for the song "Good Time Boys", which featured cut away interview footage, was made as promotional video for Mother's Milk, but the song was never released as a single. 
 Two versions of "Under the Bridge" were filmed. The second, and rarely seen version featured less footage of Anthony walking down the street. 
 The video for "If You Have to Ask" has rarely been seen and was never aired in the United States and has been taken off the internet by the RIAA. 
 A second version of "My Friends" was filmed. To this date, Anthony, Flea and Chad all agree that they prefer the second version, which shows the band recording the song in the studio over the much more known version of them wearing dresses and in a boat. The band even included the second version and not the original on their Greatest Hits DVD. 
 The videos for "Road Trippin'" and "Universally Speaking" were not released in the United States until the 2003 Greatest Hits DVD. "Desecration Smile" is also a non-U.S. release.
 On March 6, 2007 the Chili Peppers announced a contest for someone to direct a video for the song "Charlie" through their YouTube channel. The video winner has been chosen, however, the song being released as a single is still unknown.
On August 17, 2011, the band released the music video for The Adventures of Rain Dance Maggie. The video was originally directed by Kreayshawn however the band decided to shoot a second version with director, Marc Klasfeld and released his version. It is unknown why they decided not to go with Kreayshawn's video or if her video will ever be released.
Two versions of the "Brendan's Death Song" video were released. Originally the shorter radio edit version of the video was released however the band wanted the longer version released as well.

References

Videographies of American artists